The New Zealand women's national under-16 and under-17 basketball team is the national basketball team of New Zealand for Junior Women, governed by the Basketball New Zealand. It represents the country in international under-16 and under-17 women's basketball competitions. Previously the team is competing in FIBA Oceania-sanctioned tournaments but starting in 2017, they already participated in FIBA Asia's under-16 competitions.

World Cup record

References

External links

Women's national under-17 basketball teams
U